Nee Premakai is a 2002 Indian Telugu-language romance film written by Sreenivasan, directed by Muppalaneni Shiva and produced by D. Ramanaidu under Suresh Productions. The film is an adaptation to Priyadarshan's 1988 Malayalam film Mukunthetta Sumitra Vilikkunnu. The film starred Vineeth, Abbas, Laya and Sonia Agarwal in pivotal roles. Muppalaneni Shiva received the Nandi Award for Best Screenplay Writer for this film.

Story
Srinivas and Prabhu are roommates. Srinivas is a sincere guy working in BATA as manager. Prabhu is a parasite, who uses the money and room of Srinivas for his own luxury. The men have a pious and beautiful neighbor, Anjali. Srinivas sincerely loves her. Srinivas sends money ( 10,000) for Anjali as an anonymous well-wisher, since her father could not afford MCA education for Anjali. Prabhu takes the credit by pretending to be that anonymous donor. Prabhu exploits Srinivas and uses it to attract Anjali. Meanwhile, Prabhu creates such a situation where Anjali starts hating Srinivas. A relative of Srinivas talks with the parents of Anjali and makes them agree to have Anjali marry Srinivas. But when Anjali discovers this, she says that she is in love with Prabhu. Anjali's parents alter their decision and decide to have her marry Prabhu.

Cast

 Abbas as Prabhu 
 Vineeth as Srinivas
 Laya as Anjali
 Sonia Agarwal as Raaji
 D. Ramanaidu
 Kaikala Satyanarayana
 Chandramohan
 Brahmanandam
 Sudhakar
 AVS
 Ali
 M. S. Narayana
 K. P. V. Prasad
 Manorama
 Kavitha
 Shanoor Sana
 Anitha Chowdary
 Vimalasri

Soundtrack

Awards

References 

2002 films
2000s Telugu-language films
Films directed by Muppalaneni Shiva
Suresh Productions films